Giovanni Ventura Borghesi (October 29, 1640 – April 13, 1708) was an Italian painter of the Baroque period, active mainly in Rome.

Biography
Born in Città di Castello, he was initially a pupil of the painter Giovanni Battista Pacetti (called Lo Sguazzino), but by 1665 had moved to Rome to worku under Pietro da Cortona. He lived in the parish of San Lorenzo in Lucina. After his master's death, he completed some of Cortona's unfinished work at the church of the Sapienza. He painted an Annunciation and Coronation of the Virgin for the chapel of the Santissima Annunziata in the church of San Nicola da Tolentino in Rome. He also painted in Germany.

In Citta di Castello, he painted a St Francesco Solano for the church of San Giovanni Battista of the Zoccolanti.

References

1640s births
1708 deaths
People from Città di Castello
17th-century Italian painters
Italian male painters
18th-century Italian painters
Italian Baroque painters
Umbrian painters
18th-century Italian male artists